The Freiburg Konzerthaus is a concert hall in Freiburg im Breisgau, Germany, that was opened to the public in 1996. Based on plans by architect Dietrich Bangert, the building is used for concerts and performances, as well as conventions and meetings. Under the working title "Cultural Event and Conference Location" ('Kultur- und Tagungstätte,' KTS), it was one of the most controversial building projects in Freiburg since the end of World War II. Until 2016, it served as the headquarters of the Southwest German Radio Symphony Orchestra. With its multiuse great hall, it serves as a venue for a range of diverse events.

Location and surrounding area
The concert hall is located on Bismarckallee between Bertoldsstraße and Sedanstraße on the western side of Freiburg's old city. The Wiwilí bridge connects the Konrad-Adenauer-Platz courtyard directly to the lawn in front of the Herz-Jesu church in the adjacent neighbourhood of Stühlinger. The back of the building borders the city block of 'Stadttheater.

Thanks to its close proximity to the city's main train station, multiple tram stops, the bus station, and to its own underground parking garage, the concert hall enjoys optimal transportation connections within the city of Freiburg.

Architecture
According to the architect Dietrich Bangert, the building cannot be associated with any currently established architectural style or tradition. The halls have been loosely integrated into the asymmetrical base of the building and the foyer extends over several floors and multiple staircases; due to this, the hall's construction is said to represent "a small piece of the city under a single roof". Furthermore, the facade almost completely reconstructs the former borders of the city block and the building adapts to the surrounding cityscape by having the same height as the neighboring buildings.

Entrance area and foyer

While the northern facade looks rather closed because of its pink-gray granite colonnade and its adherence to the consistently large height of the buildings on Bertoldstraße, the western side offers a wide glass front and includes the main entrance. The northern facade also features a sharp-cornered, grey concrete loggia at a height of approximately 20 m. The loggia is carried by several columns and is supposed to be an outdoor representation of the inner spatial structure.

Rolf-Böhme-Saal 
This rectangular concert hall is the heart of the Konzerthaus and built like a nave. It is 47 m long, 19 m wide, and has an average height of 19 m. The hall was named after Freiburg's former mayor Rolf Böhme, in whose term the Konzerthaus was built. The room can hold up to 1,744 people, which
makes it the second biggest concert hall in Baden-Württemberg after the Festspielhaus in Baden-Baden.

Conference rooms and administration
Starting with the so-called "small drum", there are a total of nine conference rooms located on the second floor along Bertoldstraße. Of the eight rectangular rooms, six can be adjusted individually and can therefore be fitted for various occasions. All of these rooms are equipped with modern communication technology, as are the offices on the floor above.

Performers' dressing rooms can be found on the ground floor and there is a staff room in the mezzanine behind the big hall. Rooms for production, sound engineering, interpreters and administration are all in the attic. Likewise, there is storage space for instruments in the basement. All of these rooms are accessible via staircases and elevators that are not connected to the public space. Event organizers can enter the inner courtyard via Sedanstraße and access the stage on ground level through the back wall of the main hall.

Halls

Building history

Prehistory (until 1983)
During the bombing on the evening of 27 November 1944, Freiburg lost its largest public assembly room at the time, a public hall near the municipal garden, the Stadtgarten. The previous building was completed in 1854 by local architect Friedrich Eisenlohr and provided enough room for up to 5,000 people. Even the city hall, which was built in 1954, was no sufficient compensation as its one-room concept and remote location at the eastern edge of the city centre proved inadequate for many events. Due to numerous areas of new housing and the incorporation of surrounding villages into the urban area of Freiburg, up until the mid-1970s. the centre of town had been moving west into the Upper Rhine Plain.

At the end of the 1970s, a building project to bridge the railway and thus connect the Stühlinger district with the other districts had been discussed, adapting plans by architect Manfred Saß. However, these plans, the so-called Bahnhofsplatte, never got beyond the status of a pilot project, as there were enormous building costs of approximately 86 million Deutsche Mark (roughly 44 million EUR) and the Deutsche Bundesbahn did not intend to finance large-scale projects due to the increasing competition presented by air travel. Further plans, already rejected by that time, intended a new building behind the municipal theatre  or an extension of the Karlsbau.

Planning phase (until 1992)

The "culture and conference centre" feasibility study
In 1982, changes of government on all political levels led to a short-term interruption of the efforts to erect a big public building. Two years later, minister-president Lothar Späth guaranteed mayor Rolf Böhme government subsidies. In March 1984, the "culture and conference centre" feasibility study was conducted and approved by the local council.
Following the previously suggested idea of having a Bahnhofsplatte (station plate), that is, a roofing extending over the rails, this study used a city-owned plot in the immediate vicinity of the station. As the building fit in the existing architecture of the city instead of towering above it and as the construction costs came to an estimated 44 million dollars, the study was considerably more realistic and adequate to the scarce public financial resources than the failed plans for the Bahnhofsplatte project.

A report on the market opportunities and the efficiency of the project, which was subsequently commissioned, refined the guidelines and set framework conditions concerning the size of the main hall with 1,600 seats, offering flexible use. The report also defined the planning of a nearby and privately owned hotel.

On 12 November 1985, the local council set the costs at 70.5 million DM (roughly 36 million EUR). These costs were intended to be financed by a national funding of 30 Million DM (roughly 15.3 million EUR) and a reasonable equity of the local building society. The calculation also included inflation up to 76 million DM (roughly 38.9 million EUR) until the planned opening date of 1991. An architectural design competition with relatively strict rules was organized in order to realize the project and avoid proposals with high cost risk.

Architectural design competition and referendum
Between 1986 and 1988, a two-tier architectural design competition was carried out. The proposals were widely discussed by the public and led to another polarization of Freiburg's citizens.

In the first competition, aspects of urban development had priority and diverse proposals were made. One architect proposed that the neighbouring Stadttheater should be reflected in the façade of the new building and that the concert hall should have a big forecourt. Another architect proposed that the entire block boundary be preserved and that there should be no forecourt. Ultimately, a different proposal was more convincing to the jury: it was the draft by Dietrich Bangert, an architect from Berlin. After he was able to lower the construction costs to 90 million DM (roughly 46 million €), the local council accepted his draft on 9 February 1988.

Not everybody was satisfied with the resolution of the local council. The 12,000 votes, which were required for the quorum to pass, were achieved very quickly. This allowed for a referendum on this topic. This referendum was scheduled for 26 June 1988.

The realization of the project became more and more uncertain due to the short but intense referendum campaign. The main arguments for and against the concert hall are listed below:

The voter turnout was remarkably high. It was about as high as in a local election: about 50% of eligible voters participated. The opponents won by a large majority: 36,439 people voted against the concert hall and only 29,289 people in favour. However, the initiative failed because the quorum of 30%, which is required by local government law, was not achieved. 39,657 votes against the Konzerthaus would have been needed. Therefore, the local council confirmed the resolution they had passed earlier on 28 June 1988.

Revision and planning phase
Although the referendum had failed due to a formality, it did have some effect. The planning phase that now commenced was being heavily scrutinized by the public and the pressure was high to keep costs low. The revision was therefore interrupted several times until a decision was finally reached in 1991. Consequently, the final draft was heavily reduced in building space and gave the two lower floors to the hotel. However, in spite of the public's concerns, the costly stage technology and acoustic setup of the main hall were also finalized in this draft.

Supporters of the project see the high costs as a result of the long planning phase, as during this time, economic growth was high and the construction sector was experiencing a general increase in prices. Factoring in the 5 million Euros in government subsidies, the final costs would end up being 65 million Euros, and critics tried to file another referendum to stop the construction. This subsequently failed. In 1991, critics of the project filed their complaint with the higher administrative court, were they lost again. With opposition out of the way, construction could finally begin in 1992. After two years' delay, the construction of the adjacent hotel was already well underway.

Construction and opening: 1992–1996
In May 1992, excavation for the underground parking lot underneath the concert hall began.
On 28 June 1996, the concert hall was opened ceremoniously and handed over to the operator, the Freiburg Management and Marketing Association.

Apart from the political dispute, the acoustic quality of the big hall was predominantly criticized. Not only the members of the Southwest German Radio Symphony Orchestra, who are frequent tenants, with 150 rehearsals per year, but also the Berlin Philharmonic, during their first guest appearance, complained about poor conditions. They mentioned that the musicians could not hear each other very well, because the sound escaped into the  space above the stage. Even when the hall was empty, the acoustics were still hard to control. These kinds of problems are not uncommon in big concert halls shortly after their opening. For that reason, in 2001, after a testing phase of two years, thirty circular acoustic canvases, which can be adjusted in height, were installed at the ceiling above the stage area. Together with twelve mobile folding screens, they increased the investment by 800,000 DM (roughly 409,000 EUR) for the Freiburg Management and Marketing association.

References

Bibliography
 Freiburger Stadtbau GmbH, ed. Konzerthaus Freiburg. Freiburg: Bangert, 1996. .
 Josef Diel. Ein Dach für alle. Von der alten Festhalle zum neuen Konzerthaus. Freiburg: Promo, 1996. .

External links

 

Music venues in Germany
Concert halls in Germany
Tourist attractions in Freiburg im Breisgau
Buildings and structures in Freiburg im Breisgau